Emmeline Mary Dogherty Woolley (1843 – 18 March 1908) was an Australian choir leader, church musician, composer, music teacher, organist and pianist. Woolley was born in England and died in Darlinghurst, Sydney, New South Wales.

See also

 John Woolley
 Ethel Charlotte Pedley
 Louisa Macdonald
 Thomas Elder
 Emmeline Freda Du Faur

References

1843 births
1908 deaths
19th-century composers
19th-century organists
19th-century pianists
Australian Anglicans
Australian composers
Australian women composers
Australian music educators
Australian classical organists
English emigrants to colonial Australia
Australian pianists
Australian women pianists
Women organists
Women music educators
19th-century women composers
19th-century women pianists